Ali Mohammed Gedi (born 2 October 1952), popularly known as Ali Gedi, was the Prime Minister of the Transitional Federal Government (TFG) of Somalia from 2004 to 2007. He was relatively unknown in political circles upon his appointment as prime minister in November 2004. He is affiliated with the Abgaal subclan of Mogadishu's Hawiye clan, one of Somalia's four most powerful clan 'families'. He narrowly survived a suicide attack on his home that left at least seven people dead on June 3, 2007.

Biography
Ali Mohamed Gedi was born in Mogadishu, Somalia in 1952. He is from the Abgaal sub-clan of the Hawiye.

Gedi was raised by his paternal grandmother and later by his stepmother. Gedi's father was an officer in the military and in 1978 joined the Somali National Security Service (NSS) under the reign of Siad Barre at the rank of Colonel.

Gedi studied at Jamal Abdul Nasser High School in Mogadishu, graduating in 1972. He completed military training and national service, and taught in the early 1970s.  At university, Gedi excelled in his studies, and went on to the University of Pisa.  He graduated in 1978, and was subsequently employed by the Somali National University (Faculty of Veterinary Medicine) as an assistant lecturer. From 1980 to 1983, he studied at the University of Pisa for postgraduate studies and obtained a Doctorate Degree in Veterinary Pathology and Surgery. He then returned to teaching in 1983 as a lecturer and headed the department until 1990.

Political reconciliation 

He attended political reconciliation conferences in Mogadishu (1994 - 1996), in Cairo, Egypt (1997), in Addis Ababa, Ethiopia (early 1998), in Nairobi, Kenya (late 1998), in Beledweyne, Hiiran - Somalia (1999). (Ali Mohamed Gedi, share with Abdirahman Gutale).

Transitional Federal Government (TFG)

Government in exile
As head of the TFG, Gedi promised to form an inclusive government, and to strive for reconciliation among Mogadishu's warlords.

After a failed assassination attempt, Gedi fled to Nairobi, Kenya. In July 2005, he moved to Jowhar, one of two towns (the other being Baidoa) being used as a temporary joint Somali capital.

Government in Baidoa

In March 2006, fighting broke out between the Alliance for the Restoration of Peace and Counter-Terrorism (ARPCT) warlords and the Islamic Court Union (ICU) over the control of Mogadishu, which intensified in May. The conflict became known as the Second Battle of Mogadishu. The Prime Minister demanded the warlords, four of whom were members of the TFG government, to cease fighting the ICU, but this command was universally ignored and so Ghedi dismissed them from Parliament. These included National Security Minister Mohamed Afrah Qanyare, Commerce Minister Musa Sudi Yalahow, Militia Rehabilitation Minister Issa Botan Alin and Religious Affairs Minister Omar Muhamoud Finnish.

Return to Mogadishu

During December 2006, the ICU and affiliated Islamist militias suffered crucial defeats by the TFG and Ethiopian armies, who on December 29 entered Mogadishu relatively unopposed. Although Ghedi was jubilantly welcomed to the city, his Ethiopian allies faced angry crowds who pelted Ethiopian troops with rocks.

On January 1, 2007, he announced "The warlord era in Mogadishu is now over." Ghedi's first actions included declaring martial law for three months, calling for the disarmament of the militias, and the appointment of new judges.

Resignation 

Gedi announced his resignation before parliament in Baidoa on October 29, 2007, due to differences with the Somali president, Abdullahi Yusuf. It is rumored that Gedi accepted to resign for future political support. He remained a member of parliament.

In early January 2008, Gedi announced that he would run for president in 2009.

References

1952 births
Living people
21st-century prime ministers of Somalia
Members of the Transitional Federal Parliament
Mogadishu University alumni
University of Pisa alumni
Academic staff of Somali National University